John Meisel  (born October 23, 1923) is a Canadian political scientist, professor, and scholar, and former chairman of the Canadian Radio-television and Telecommunications Commission.

He has written extensively on various aspects of politics, notably on parties, elections, ethnic relations, politics and leisure culture, and, at the beginning of his academic career, international politics. 

He has been a pioneer in Canada of research on electoral behaviour, political parties and the relationship between politics and leisure culture, particularly the arts. Throughout his career he has examined the cohesion (or its absence) of the Canadian communities. He has also lectured and written about regulation, broadcasting, telecommunications, and the information society.

Career
Meisel was born in Vienna, Austria in October 1923 to Jewish Czech parents. His father worked for Baťa Shoes at its headquarters in Zlín, Moravia, Czechoslovakia in the 1930s. As the Nazi occupation of Czechoslovakia became imminent, Baťa sent its Jewish employees out of Czechoslovakia to Bata centres abroad, and the Meisel family moved to Casablanca and then Haiti before settling in Bata's Canadian company town of Batawa, Ontario in 1942.

John Meisel matriculated from Pickering College in Newmarket, Ontario. He received his university training at the University  of Toronto's Victoria College, and the London School of Economics. He has taught at Queen's University since 1949, where he is a professor emeritus. He served on the Ontario Advisory Committee on Confederation in 1965.

He worked on the 1965 Canadian National Election Study, and was a member of the ICPSR (Inter-university Consortium for Political and Social Research) Council from 1966 to 1968.

In 1975, he was a consultant for the Trilateral Commission's report Crisis of Democracy. From 1980 to 1983 he was Chairman of the Canadian Radio-television and Telecommunications Commission. From 1992 until 1995, he was the 103rd President of the Royal Society of Canada.

In 1989 he was made an Officer of the Order of Canada; promoted to Companion in 1999.

He was the founding editor of The Canadian Journal of Political Science and of The International Political Science Review.

Philanthropy 
In addition to his contributions to Canadian university research and public communications, Dr Meisel is known for his philanthropy in Kingston, Ontario. One gift was his 50-hectare property near Crow Lake north of Kingston. This was donated to the Rideau Valley Conservation Foundation in 2000 as a sanctuary of peace and quiet for the residents of Eastern Ontario. The property is called the Meisel Woods Conservation Area. Over the years, modest improvements and public safety features have been installed. A commemorative trail called the Sandi Slater Memorial Walk has been added by the Foundation.

References

External links
 Royal Society of Canada biography
 John Meisel fonds at Queen's University Archives

1923 births
Living people
Alumni of the London School of Economics
Czechoslovak emigrants to Canada
Canadian political scientists
Chairpersons of the Canadian Radio-television and Telecommunications Commission
Companions of the Order of Canada
Fellows of the Royal Society of Canada
Academic staff of the Queen's University at Kingston
University of Toronto alumni
Jews who emigrated to escape Nazism
Czech Jews
Jewish Canadian writers
People from Vienna
People from Zlín
Presidents of the Canadian Political Science Association